Newport was a rotten borough situated in Cornwall. It is now the suburb of Newport within the town of Launceston, which was itself also a parliamentary borough at the same period. It is also referred to as Newport Iuxta Launceston, to distinguish it from other constituencies named Newport.

History
From 1529 until it was abolished by the great reform act of 1832, Newport returned two Members of Parliament. Until the early 18th century, the right to vote was held by all inhabitants paying scot and lot, but subsequently it was converted to a burgage franchise, meaning that the right to vote was tied to ownership of certain properties within the borough, which could be bought and sold at will. This reduced the number of qualified voters: under the scot and lot qualification around 70 people had had the right to vote, but by 1831 the number was only about 12.

The borough had a population of 595 in 1831. The Lord of the Manor, owning extensive property within the borough and with the effective power of choosing both members of parliament, was the Duke of Northumberland.

By the Reform Act, Newport was abolished as a separate borough, but the boundaries of Launceston were extended to include Newport. As Launceston's representation was halved by the same measure, the combined borough was thereafter represented by a single MP whereas previously there had been four members.

Members of Parliament

1529–1629
 Constituency created 1529

1640–1832

Notes

References

 D. Brunton & D. H. Pennington, Members of the Long Parliament (London: George Allen & Unwin, 1954)
 Cobbett's Parliamentary History of England, from the Norman Conquest in 1066 to the year 1803 (London: Thomas Hansard, 1808) 
 
 Maija Jansson (ed.), Proceedings in Parliament, 1614 (House of Commons) (Philadelphia: American Philosophical Society, 1988)
 J. E. Neale, The Elizabethan House of Commons (London: Jonathan Cape, 1949)
 J. Holladay Philbin, Parliamentary Representation 1832 - England and Wales (New Haven: Yale University Press, 1965)
 Henry Stooks Smith, The Parliaments of England from 1715 to 1847 (2nd edition, edited by F. W. S. Craig - Chichester: Parliamentary Reference Publications, 1973)

Further reading
 

Constituencies of the Parliament of the United Kingdom established in 1529
Constituencies of the Parliament of the United Kingdom disestablished in 1832
Parliamentary constituencies in Cornwall (historic)
Rotten boroughs
Launceston, Cornwall